Mlynář is a Czech surname deriving from the Czech word for "miller", mlynář. Slovak variant is Mlynár

Mlynář, Mlynár or Mlynar may refer to:
Zdeněk Mlynář, Czech politician and politologue
Peter Mlynár, Slovak skier

Czech-language surnames
Slovak-language surnames